Weed Airport  is a public airport located four miles (6.4 km) northwest of Weed, serving Siskiyou County, California, USA.

References 
Weed Airport (County of Siskiyou website)

External links 

Mount Shasta
Airports in Siskiyou County, California